Danny Heatley may refer to:

Dany Heatley (born 1981), Canadian professional ice hockey player
Danny Heatley (musician), British drummer